Virtue's Revolt is a 1924 American silent drama film directed by James Chapin and starring Edith Thornton, Crauford Kent and Betty Morrissey.

Synopsis
An ambitious young actress comes to New York City but finds that she can only secure a career by becoming the lover of a theatre manager. Refusing at first, she falls in love with another man, before striking a bargain that launches her on the Broadway stage.

Cast
 Edith Thornton as Streisa Cane
 Crauford Kent as Bertram Winthrope
 Betty Morrissey as Ruth Cane
 Charles Cruz as Tom Powers
 Florence Lee as Mrs. Cane
 Eddie Phillips as Elton Marbridge 
 Melbourne MacDowell as 	Family Lawyer
 Niles Welch as Steve Marbridge

References

Bibliography
 Munden, Kenneth White. The American Film Institute Catalog of Motion Pictures Produced in the United States, Part 1. University of California Press, 1997.

External links
 

1924 films
1924 drama films
1920s English-language films
American silent feature films
Silent American drama films
American black-and-white films
Films directed by James Chapin
Films set in New York City
1920s American films
English-language drama films